American singer and actor Demi Lovato has released two video albums and appeared in various music videos, films, and television shows. From her debut album Don't Forget (2008), she released music videos for its eponymous single as well as "Get Back" and "La La Land". Lovato released her second album Here We Go Again in 2009, producing music videos for the eponymous single and "Remember December". Her third studio album Unbroken (2011) spawned music videos for "Skyscraper", which won Best Video with a Message at the 2012 MTV Video Music Awards, and "Give Your Heart a Break". She then released her fourth studio album Demi (2013), which was accompanied by music videos for "Heart Attack", which was nominated for Best Female Video at the 2013 MTV Video Music Awards, "Made in the USA", "Neon Lights", and "Really Don't Care".

After signing a record deal with Island Records, Lovato released her fifth studio album Confident (2015), along with three music videos for the songs "Cool for the Summer", "Confident", and "Stone Cold". A sixth studio album, Tell Me You Love Me followed in 2017. It produced music videos for "Sorry Not Sorry", which was nominated for Best Pop Video at the 2018 MTV Video Music Awards, and "Tell Me You Love Me".

Lovato's first acting role was on Barney & Friends from 2002 to 2004. She subsequently starred as Charlotte Adams during the first season of As the Bell Rings. Lovato then played Mitchie Torres in Camp Rock (2008) and Camp Rock 2: The Final Jam (2010) as well as the title character in Sonny with a Chance (2009–2011). Her subsequent television work included serving as a judge for two seasons on The X Factor (2012–2013) as well as recurring roles on Glee (2013–2014) and Will & Grace (2020). In film, she has had roles in Princess Protection Program (2009), Smurfs: The Lost Village (2017), Charming (2018), and Eurovision Song Contest: The Story of Fire Saga (2020). Lovato additionally has been the main focus of the documentaries Demi Lovato: Stay Strong (2012), Demi Lovato: Simply Complicated (2017) and Demi Lovato: Dancing with the Devil (2021), and served as executive producer on the two latter as well as the documentary Beyond Silence (2017).

Music videos

Guest appearances

Video albums

Filmography

Film

Television

Web

Producer

References

External links
 
 Demi Lovato's official channel on YouTube

Videograpgy
Videographies of American artists
Actress filmographies
American filmographies